Pomatostomus is a genus of small to medium-sized birds endemic to Australia-New Guinea. All four species are distributed in Australia, and only the grey-crowned babbler could also be found in south New Guinea.

Pomatostomus is the type genus of the family Pomatostomidae. It was the only genus in the family before the Papuan babbler was classified as a separate genus Garritornis.

Species

References

External links
Pseudo-babbler videos on the Internet Bird Collection

Bird genera
 01
Higher-level bird taxa restricted to the Australasia-Pacific region
Pomatostomidae